Nocathiacin I is an antibiotic peptide.  It is a fermentation product isolated from Nocardia sp.

Notes
Synthesis of novel nocathiacin-class antibiotics. Condensation of glycolaldehyde with primary amides and tandem reductive amination of amadori-rearranged 2-oxoethyl intermediates

Antibiotics